The Jamaican gray anole or stripefoot anole (Anolis lineatopus) is a species of lizard endemic to the island of Jamaica. The species is of a similar niche in Jamaica to a related species called Anolis grahami, leading to them often being directly competitive with each other.

References

L
Lizards of the Caribbean
Endemic fauna of Jamaica
Reptiles of Jamaica
Reptiles described in 1840
Taxa named by John Edward Gray